Skaug is a surname. Notable people with the surname include:

Arne Skaug (1906–1974), Norwegian economist, civil servant, diplomat and politician
Gunnar Skaug (1940–2006) was a Norwegian politician
Morten Skaug, Norwegian curler and curling coach
Ove Skaug (1912–2005), Norwegian engineer and civil servant

See also
Skauge